Michael Schumacher is a German former racing driver. Throughout his career in the grassroots categories, he won the 1990 German Formula Three Championship and 1990 Macau Grand Prix. In his Formula 1 career, Schumacher has won seven world titles a record shared with British driver Lewis Hamilton. Together with Sebastian Vettel, Schumacher won the Race of Champions Nations' Cup six times in a row for Germany, from 2007 to 2012.

Karting record

Formula Three and Formula 3000

Wins

Podiums

World Sportscar Championship

Wins

Podiums

Formula One

World titles

Grand Prix wins

Podiums

Pole positions

Records 

Footnotes

Race of Champions record

Drivers Cup

Nations Cup

Awards

Filmography

See also 
List of Formula One driver records

References 

Career achievements
Career achievements of Formula One drivers